Lê Tuấn Minh (born 21 October 1996) is a Vietnamese chess player and Grandmaster. He is the winner of the 2020 Vietnamese Chess Championship. In July 2022, he earned his final required norm to become Vietnam's 13th chess grandmaster.

Lê grew up in Hanoi and started playing chess at the age of 8.  He attended Hanoi University of Law.

References

External links
 
 
 
 
 

1996 births
Living people
Vietnamese chess players
Chess International Masters